Nur Mohd Azriyn Ayub (born 19 July 1993) is a Malaysian badminton player. He was one of the players that helped the Malaysian team to win gold at the 2011 BWF World Junior Championships.

Career 
In 2013, he won the gold medals in the men's singles and men's team event at the Islamic Solidarity Games in Palembang, Indonesia. In 2015, he became the champion of the Malaysia Badminton Championships in men's doubles event partnered with Mohamad Arif Abdul Latif. In 2016, he became the runner-up at the Smiling Fish International tournament in men's doubles event. Together with Low Juan Shen, he won the men's doubles title at the 2018 World University Championships.

Achievements

Summer Universiade 
Mixed doubles

World University Championships 
Men's doubles

Mixed doubles

BWF World Tour (2 titles) 
The BWF World Tour, which was announced on 19 March 2017 and implemented in 2018, is a series of elite badminton tournaments sanctioned by the Badminton World Federation (BWF). The BWF World Tours are divided into levels of World Tour Finals, Super 1000, Super 750, Super 500, Super 300 (part of the HSBC World Tour), and the BWF Tour Super 100.

Men's doubles

BWF International Challenge/Series (3 runners-up) 
Men's doubles

  BWF International Challenge tournament
  BWF International Series tournament

References

External links 
 

1993 births
Living people
Malaysian male badminton players
Universiade medalists in badminton
Universiade silver medalists for Malaysia
Universiade bronze medalists for Malaysia
Medalists at the 2017 Summer Universiade
21st-century Malaysian people